The imperial election of 22 May 1400 was an imperial election held to select the emperor of the Holy Roman Empire. It took place in Frankfurt.

Background 
Wenceslaus IV of Bohemia, king of Bohemia, had been elected Holy Roman Emperor in the imperial election of 1376.

On 20 September 1378 the cardinals elected Antipope Clement VII pope in opposition to Pope Urban VI, whom they had come to distrust.  The existence of two popes in opposition to one another, called the Western Schism, led to escalating international crises as the kings of Europe were forced to choose sides. On 29 November Wenceslaus's father Charles IV, Holy Roman Emperor died, and Wenceslaus acceded to the throne.  Civil unrest in Bohemia prevented Wenceslaus from effectively administering the empire; he declined even to have a coronation ceremony as Holy Roman Emperor.

Because of Wenceslaus's weak rule and his failure to stamp out civil unrest or resolve the Western Schism, three of the prince-electors of the empire convened to remove him. They were:

 Rupert, King of Germany, elector of the Electoral Palatinate
 Rudolf III, Duke of Saxe-Wittenberg, elector of Saxony
 Jobst of Moravia, elector of Brandenburg

Elected 
The three electors at Frankfurt chose Frederick I, Duke of Brunswick-Lüneburg.  However, the election did not have legal force as neither Johann II von Nassau, elector of Mainz, nor Werner of Falkenstein, elector of Trier, nor Frederick III of Saardwerden, elector of Cologne, nor Wenceslaus himself, who as king of Bohemia was an elector of the Holy Roman Empire, recognized it.

Aftermath 
Frederick I was murdered on his way home from the meeting on June 5 by Henry VII, Count of Waldeck.

1399
1400 in the Holy Roman Empire
14th-century elections
Non-partisan elections